Jean-Jacques Susini (30 July 1933 – 3 July 2017) was a French political figure, militant and cofounder of the Organisation armée secrète (OAS), a paramilitary organization opposing Algerian independence from France.

Life
Born in Algiers, French Algeria to Corsican parents. Susini became head of the student association there in 1959. In January 1960, he, Pierre Lagaillarde and Joseph Ortiz were responsible for the journée des barricades ("day of the barricades") in Algiers. 

In 1960 he was detained at La Santé Prison in Paris. In the prison he was visited by Jean-Marie Le Pen. He took advantage of his parole to escape to Spain, with Pierre Lagaillarde, Jean-Maurice Demarquet, Marcel Ronda and Fernand Féral Lefevre, where he joined Raoul Salan and founded the OAS with him and Pierre Lagaillarde on 3 December 1960. He was responsible for psychological action and propaganda (APP). After the arrest of Raoul Salan in April 1962, Susini became the head of the OAS for Algiers and Constantine. 
In June 1962, he brokered an (ultimately failed) agreement with the FLN.
Beginning in 1962, Susini hid for five years in Italy under a false identity. 
During this time he was wanted in France for various attempts to assassinate Charles de Gaulle (in particular the one of 15 August 1964, near the "Mont Faron" in Toulon) and for his role in the OAS. He was twice condemned to death in absentia.

Susini benefited from an amnesty in 1968 by Charles de Gaulle, returning to France.
In 1970, he was imprisoned for 16 months. In 1972 he was imprisoned again for two years. He was believed to have been responsible for the disappearance of colonel Raymond Gorel, alias "Cimeterre", the former cashier of the OAS. Again, he benefited from an amnesty by the government by François Mitterrand.

He was a member of the far-right National Front and wrote a multivolume history of the OAS, the first volume of which covered the period from May to July 1961, has been published.

Susini later ran unsuccessfully for office in Marseille on the National Front ticket in the 1997 elections.

References

Sources 
 Clément Steuer: Susini et l'OAS. l'Harmattan, Paris 2004, 
 Henri Pouillot: La villa Susini. Tortures en Algerie. Edition Tirésias, Paris 2001, 
 Jean-Jacques Susini: Histoire de l’O.A.S. Edition de la Table Ronde, Paris 1963. 
 Rearguard Action for Terror Time magazine, 29 June 1962

1933 births
2017 deaths
People from Algiers
Pieds-Noirs
Members of the Organisation armée secrète
National Rally (France) politicians
People sentenced to death in absentia